The Rough Riders is an American Western television series set in the West after the American Civil War. It aired on ABC for the 1958-1959 television season. It was produced by Ziv Television.

Synopsis
The program is about three ex-soldiers, two at one time fighting for the Union side and one for the Confederate, who traveled together across the West, fighting trouble and bad guys. The series starred Kent Taylor as ex-Union Captain Jim Flagg, Jan Merlin as former Confederate Lieutenant Colin Kirby, and Peter Whitney as former Union Sergeant Buck Sinclair.
Prior to his starring role in The Rough Riders, Kent Taylor previously starred in still another Ziv Television-produced series, Boston Blackie, which aired for two seasons in syndication from 1951–53.

Among series guest stars were John Anderson, Lon Chaney, Jr., James Coburn, Mike Connors, William Conrad, Russ Conway, Walter Coy, Mimi Gibson, Ed Hinton, Jack Hogan, DeForest Kelley, Douglas Kennedy, George Macready, Tyler McVey,  Joyce Meadows, Leonard Nimoy, Broderick Crawford, Judson Pratt, Stuart Randall, Karen Sharpe, Dan Sheridan, Carol Thurston, Gary Vinson, Barbara Woodell and Larry Pennell.

The Rough Riders produced thirty-nine episodes.Unlike several other more successful Ziv Television-produced shows, such as Bat Masterson, Highway Patrol, and Sea Hunt, The Rough Riders, as of 2019, has not had an official DVD release.

Episodes

References

External links
 

1958 American television series debuts
1959 American television series endings
American Broadcasting Company original programming
Black-and-white American television shows
Television series by MGM Television
1950s Western (genre) television series